Logic (stylized as "logic.") is an electronic cigarette brand of Japan Tobacco International.

Description 

Logic sells rechargeable and disposable e-cigarettes. Nicotine is obtained from a polyethylene glycol or propolene glycol e-liquid solution, and other chemicals are included such as glycerin and flavorings. The end of the device turns blue when in use.

In the first quarter of 2015, Logic Technology Development held a 20% market share in United States convenience stores. In April 2015, Japan Tobacco International agreed to acquire Logic Technology Development.

History 
Logic Technology Development was founded in 2010 by Eli Alelov and Howard Panes.  Panes served as chief operating office of the company.

References

External links

Elf Bar website
Canadian Website

Electronic cigarette brands